The black-bellied antwren (Formicivora melanogaster) is a species of bird in the family Thamnophilidae. It is found in Bolivia, Brazil, and Paraguay. Its natural habitat is subtropical or tropical dry forests.

The black-bellied antwren was described by the Austrian ornithologist August von Pelzeln in 1868 and given its current binomial name Formicivora melanogaster.

References

black-bellied antwren
Birds of Bolivia
Birds of Brazil
Birds of the Caatinga
black-bellied antwren
black-bellied antwren
Taxonomy articles created by Polbot